Fort DuPont State Park is a Delaware state park located in Delaware City, Delaware. Fort DuPont itself, named after Rear Admiral Samuel Francis duPont, was used as a military base from the Civil War through World War II, and was part of a three fort defense system along with Fort Delaware and Fort Mott, with the purpose of protecting the Delaware River and the city of Philadelphia from naval attacks from 1897 through 1942. Fort DuPont State Park is situated along the Delaware River and Chesapeake and Delaware Canal.

Leisure and historical interpretation
Fort DuPont State Park contains the home field of the Diamond State Base Ball Club, a vintage base ball team.  The Diamond State Base Ball Club typically plays 4-6 games there per year.  The Diamond State Base Ball Club also plays at least once per year at Fort Delaware on Pea Patch Island and also at nearby Port Penn, Delaware.  The Diamond State Base Ball Club is a non-profit amateur organization created for the purposes of providing physical fitness to its members, educating the public on the history of baseball and local history, and serving as a point of public pride.

External links
Fort DuPont State Park

State parks of Delaware
DuPont
Buildings and structures in New Castle County, Delaware
Delaware in the American Civil War
Protected areas established in 1992
Parks in New Castle County, Delaware
1992 establishments in Delaware